The 1989 Maine Black Bears football team was an American football team that represented the University of Maine as a member of the Yankee Conference during the 1989 NCAA Division I-AA football season. Scott Hough and John Gibson were the team captains.

Schedule

References

Maine
Maine Black Bears football seasons
Yankee Conference football champion seasons
Maine Black Bears football